Abisogun Leigh is a Nigerian academic and administrator. He was the Vice-Chancellor of Lagos State University from 2001–2005.
He succeeded Fatiu Ademola Akesode who died before the end of his tenure in March 2001; and was appointed by Bola Tinubu.

Personal life
Leigh loves swimming and is a patron of the Swimming Section of the Lagos Country Club

References

Living people
Nigerian Christians
Vice-Chancellors of Lagos State University
Academic staff of Lagos State University
Year of birth missing (living people)